Bionia is a small genus of flowering plants in the family Fabaceae, subfamily Faboideae, native to central and eastern Brazil. It was resurrected from Camptosema.

Species
The following species are accepted:
Bionia coccinea 
Bionia coriacea 
Bionia pedicellata 
Bionia tomentosa

References

Faboideae
Fabaceae genera
Endemic flora of Brazil